Judge Shields may refer to:

Perry Shields (1925–2002), judge of the United States Tax Court
William Bayard Shields (1780–1823), judge of the United States District Court for the District of Mississippi